Psalm 77 is the 77th psalm of the Book of Psalms, beginning in English in the King James Version: "I cried unto God with my voice, even unto God with my voice; and he gave ear unto me". In the slightly different numbering system used in the Greek Septuagint and Latin Vulgate translations of the Bible, this psalm is Psalm 76. In Latin, it is known as "Voce mea ad Dominum clamavi".

The psalm forms a regular part of Jewish, Catholic, Lutheran, Anglican and other Protestant liturgies. It has been set to music.

Text

King James Version 
 I cried unto God with my voice, even unto God with my voice; and he gave ear unto me.
 In the day of my trouble I sought the Lord: my sore ran in the night, and ceased not: my soul refused to be comforted.
 I remembered God, and was troubled: I complained, and my spirit was overwhelmed. Selah.
 Thou holdest mine eyes waking: I am so troubled that I cannot speak.
 I have considered the days of old, the years of ancient times.
 I call to remembrance my song in the night: I commune with mine own heart: and my spirit made diligent search.
 Will the Lord cast off for ever? and will he be favourable no more?
 Is his mercy clean gone for ever? doth his promise fail for evermore?
 Hath God forgotten to be gracious? hath he in anger shut up his tender mercies? Selah.
 And I said, This is my infirmity: but I will remember the years of the right hand of the most High.
 I will remember the works of the LORD: surely I will remember thy wonders of old.
 I will meditate also of all thy work, and talk of thy doings.
 Thy way, O God, is in the sanctuary: who is so great a God as our God?
 Thou art the God that doest wonders: thou hast declared thy strength among the people.
 Thou hast with thine arm redeemed thy people, the sons of Jacob and Joseph. Selah.
 The waters saw thee, O God, the waters saw thee; they were afraid: the depths also were troubled.
 The clouds poured out water: the skies sent out a sound: thine arrows also went abroad.
 The voice of thy thunder was in the heaven: the lightnings lightened the world: the earth trembled and shook.
 Thy way is in the sea, and thy path in the great waters, and thy footsteps are not known.
 Thou leddest thy people like a flock by the hand of Moses and Aaron.

Content 
The psalm begins with a cry of distress: the psalmist has been experiencing profound difficulties, and his cries to God appear to have been ignored; only his memories of the past seem to bring anything even resembling joy. However, the psalmist then remembers God's integrity and realises that the failure of his hopes is the result of misplaced expectations of God's actions, rather than God's failure to act. Recalling God's actions in the past and his rule even over the natural world, he concludes with praise of "the God who performs miracles" (verse 14).

Interpretations
Coming from an evangelical Protestant perspective, Charles Spurgeon deemed the psalm the words of a single individual, in contrast to others who had interpreted it as representing the voice of the nation: "It utterly destroys all the beauty, all the tenderness and depth of feeling in the opening portion, if we suppose that the people are introduced speaking in the first person." John Calvin observed parallels to certain other biblical poetry, such as Psalm 118:18 and the hymn in the final chapter of Habakkuk: according to Calvin, the three share a common theme of becoming aware of ultimate divine deliverance from seemingly intractable terrors.

Uses

Judaism 
Psalm 77 is recited along with Parshat HaChodesh and is recited on the third through sixth days of Sukkot.

It is one of the ten Psalms of the Tikkun HaKlali of Rebbe Nachman of Breslov.

Song 
Peter van Essen's Dutch song, In het diepst van de nacht is based on Psalm 77.

Musical settings 
Heinrich Schütz set Psalm 77 in a metred version in German, "Ich ruf zu Gott mit meiner Stimm", SWV 174, as part of the Becker Psalter, first published in 1628.

References

External links 

 
 
  in Hebrew and English, Mechon-mamre
 Text of Psalm 77 according to the 1928 Psalter
 For the leader; According to Jeduthun. A psalm of Asaph. I cry aloud to God. (text and footnotes) United States Conference of Catholic Bishops
 Psalm 77 – The Troubled Heart Remembers God’s Great Works (text and detailed commentary) enduringword.com
 Psalm 77:1 (introduction and text) Bible study tools
 Psalm 77/ Refrain: In the day of my trouble I have sought the Lord. Church of England
 Psalm 77 Bible gateway
 Charles H. Spurgeon: Psalm 77 (commentary) spurgeon.org

077